Wálter Centeno Corea (born 6 October 1974) is a Costa Rican former professional footballer who played as an attacking midfielder and current manager of Guadalupe.

He was a regular member of the Costa Rica national team and holds the record for appearances, having gained 137 caps (135 FIFA official caps) and scored 24 goals.

Club career

Saprissa
Nicknamed Paté, Centeno started his career at Saprissa, who loaned him out to Belén for whom he made his professional debut on 4 February 1995 against Alajuelense. He scored his first goal on 3 September 1995 for Belén against Turrialba. He earned his nickname in his childhood due to his love for eating pate's.

AEK Athens
After seven years at Saprissa Centeno had a short spell abroad when he moved to Greece to play for AEK Athens. While playing for AEK, he participated in the UEFA Champions League Group Stage managing to score in the team's away home draws against Real Madrid at Estadio Santiago Bernabéu in the 2–2 draw and Roma at Stadio Olimpico in 1–1 draw, as they achieved the record of drawing all the matches of the group stage. After one season, Centeno filed an appeal for debts of club to him and was released.

Back at Saprissa
In he returned to Saprissa, where was named the best player of the 2003–04 Costa Rican season by the Costa Rican sports media, after scoring nine goals while orchestrating Saprissa's offense, helping the team to win the league.

With Saprissa, he won 10 national championships and one CONCACAF Champions Cup, winning the title with a 3–2 aggregate win over Mexico's UNAM Pumas in the final. He was part of the team that played the 2005 FIFA Club World Championship Toyota Cup, where Saprissa finished third behind São Paulo and Liverpool. His appearance at this tournament was considered as outstanding by FIFA experts.

He retired in 2012, his final league match was on 5 May 2012 for Saprissa against Santos de Guápiles. Saprissa retired the no. 8 shirt in his honour as well as definitely retiring the no. 10 shirt of Alonso Solís.

Puerto Rico
In April 2013, Centeno came out of retirement to join Puerto Rican side Bayamón.

International career
Centeno played his first game for the Costa Rica national football team on 27 September 1995 against Jamaica. He has been a fixture for the team for the last thirteen years, playing in the Pan American Games held in Mar del Plata, Argentina, in 1995; the Copa América tournaments of 1997, 2001 and 2004; plus the FIFA World Cup in 2002 and 2006. On 1 April 2009, he surpassed the record of caps for Costa Rica (held then by Luis Marín, 124 caps, 5 goals) as at 18 November 2009 he has 137 caps and 24 goals. He was the captain of Costa Rica national football team for the last part of 2010 FIFA World Cup qualifications. Rodrigo Kenton, the appointed manager replacing the fired Hernan Medford, chose him for covering this important role in the team because of his experience, hardening and leadership. Centeno played his last game on the national team on 18 November 2009, where they tied 1–1, in which he scored. The game meant that Costa Rica will not be in World Cup 2010. Centeno's goal was his last with as an International player, and it also marked the last goal of the 2010 FIFA World Cup qualifying stage.

Shortly after that game, he announced his quitting from national team.

Personal life
Centeno is a son of Benigno Centeno and Lidieth Corea and he is married to Vivian Gutiérrez with whom he has three children.

Career statistics
Scores and results list Costa Rica's goal tally first, score column indicates score after each Centeno goal.

Honours 
Deportivo Saprissa
 Primera División de Costa Rica (10): 1997–98, 1998–99, 2003–04, 2005–06, 2006–07, 2007 Apertura, 2008 Clausura-Invierno, Verano-Apertura 2008, Campeonato de Verano-Clausura 2010
 CONCACAF Champions' Cup: 2005
 Copa Interclubes UNCAF: 1998, 2003
 FIFA Club World Cup third place: 2005

Costa Rica
 CONCACAF Gold Cup: runner-up 2002
 UNCAF Nations Cup: 1999, 2003, 2007; runner-up 2001

Individual
 CONCACAF Gold Cup All-Tournament team: 2007
 CONCACAF Gold Cup Top scorer: 2003
 CONCACAF Gold Cup Best XI: 2003

See also
 List of men's footballers with 100 or more international caps

References

External links
 

1974 births
Living people
People from Puntarenas Province
Costa Rican footballers
Association football midfielders
Deportivo Saprissa players
Belén F.C. players
AEK Athens F.C. players
Liga FPD players
Super League Greece players
Costa Rica international footballers
1997 Copa América players
2000 CONCACAF Gold Cup players
2001 UNCAF Nations Cup players
2001 Copa América players
2002 CONCACAF Gold Cup players
2002 FIFA World Cup players
2003 UNCAF Nations Cup players
2003 CONCACAF Gold Cup players
2004 Copa América players
2006 FIFA World Cup players
2007 UNCAF Nations Cup players
2007 CONCACAF Gold Cup players
2009 CONCACAF Gold Cup players
FIFA Century Club
Copa Centroamericana-winning players
Central American Games gold medalists for Costa Rica
Central American Games medalists in football
Costa Rican expatriate footballers
Costa Rican expatriate sportspeople in Greece
Costa Rican expatriate sportspeople in Puerto Rico
Expatriate footballers in Greece
Expatriate footballers in Puerto Rico
Costa Rican football managers
Puntarenas F.C. managers
Municipal Grecia managers
Deportivo Saprissa managers